The Untitled The Lord of the Rings is an upcoming fantasy film written and directed by  Peter Jackson. The film is based on The Lord of the Rings by J. R. R. Tolkien.

Production
New Line Cinema, a subsidiary of Warner Bros. Pictures, is set to produce the upcoming films. The production company previously produced the trilogy directed by Peter Jackson between the years 2001 and 2003.

References

1
American epic films
American fantasy adventure films
Films about dwarfs
Films directed by Peter Jackson
Films produced by Barrie M. Osborne
Films produced by Fran Walsh
Films produced by Peter Jackson